Elva Ruby Miller (October 5, 1907 – July 5, 1997), who recorded under the name Mrs. Miller, was an American singer who gained some fame in the 1960s for her series of shrill and off-tempo renditions of popular songs such as "Moon River", "Monday, Monday", "A Lover's Concerto" and "Downtown". An untrained mezzo-soprano, she sang in a heavy, vibrato-laden style; according to Irving Wallace, David Wallechinsky and Amy Wallace in The Book of Lists 2, Miller's voice was compared to the sound of "roaches scurrying across a trash can lid."

Nevertheless, "Downtown" reached the Billboard Hot 100 singles chart in April 1966, peaking at No. 82. The single's B-side, "A Lover's Concerto," also cracked the Hot 100 that same month at No. 95.

Life and career
Elva Ruby Connes was born in Joplin, Missouri, the third of seven children born to Edward and Ada (Martin) Connes, and was raised in Missouri and Kansas. She married John Richardson Miller, a professional investor 30 years her senior, on January 17, 1934. They moved to Claremont, California the following year, where she studied music, voice and composition at Pomona College and involved herself in church and community projects.
She said that singing was merely a hobby, but she produced several records, mainly of classical, gospel and children's songs. She self-financed and recorded at least one 45’ ("Slumber Song"), and distributed it to local orphanages. Arranger Fred Bock heard her recording and convinced her to try more modern songs, after which he presented the recordings to multiple record labels.

Miller was discovered by radio disc jockey (and later Laugh-In announcer) Gary Owens, who first featured Miller on his radio program in 1960. Owens also included her on a limited-run album of his comedy routines. In 1965, Miller was signed to Capitol Records by young producer Lex de Azevedo.

Miller's success, as with that of Florence Foster Jenkins before her and Wing after her, was largely attributable to the amateurish quality of her singing. Capitol Records seemed eager to emphasize it; in a 1967 interview with Life magazine, Miller claimed that during recording sessions, she was deliberately conducted one half beat ahead of or behind time, and that the songs on the finished album represented the worst take from each song's set of recordings. Her first LP, with the tongue-in-cheek title Mrs. Miller's Greatest Hits, was issued by Capitol in 1966. Composed entirely of well-known pop standards, it sold more than 250,000 copies in its first three weeks. Owens wrote the album's liner notes. Will Success Spoil Mrs. Miller?! followed, and The Country Soul of Mrs. Miller came a year later.

Miller sang for American servicemen in Vietnam, performed at the Hollywood Bowl and appeared on numerous television talk and variety shows. She also appeared in Roddy McDowall's film The Cool Ones, in which she sang "It's Magic". Eventually, public interest in Miller began to  wane, and Capitol Records dropped her from its roster in 1968. She released one album, Mrs. Miller Does Her Thing, on the small Amaret Records label, before issuing several singles on her own Vibrato Records label. She recorded two albums of material at Radio Recorders studios in Hollywood that were issued by Dunhill Records, which went largely unnoticed. Her last known recording was a 1971 self-released EP.

Miller officially retired in 1973, when interest in her career had almost completely vanished. She spent her remaining years working for various charities. She lived in a condo in Northridge, California until the earthquake in 1994, and she then moved to a retirement home.

She may have been the inspiration for a similar act called Mr. Miller and the Blue Notes, who released a 1966 version of the Herman's Hermits hit "Mrs. Brown, You've Got a Lovely Daughter".

Death
Elva Miller died at the Garden Terrace Retirement Center in Vista, California in 1997 at the age of 89. She was interred at the Pomona Mausoleum at Pomona Valley Memorial Park in Pomona, California. Two years later, a compilation CD of her work was released on Capitol's Ultra-Lounge label titled Wild, Cool & Swingin': The Artist Collection Volume Three.

Discography

Albums 

"—" did not chart

Charting singles

See also
 Leona Anderson
 Florence Foster Jenkins
 Tryphosa Bates-Batcheller 
 William Hung
 William Topaz McGonagall
 William Shatner's musical career
 Jonathan and Darlene Edwards

References

External links
Mrs. Miller's World website

1907 births
1997 deaths
20th-century American singers
20th-century American women singers
American women pop singers
American novelty song performers
People from Joplin, Missouri
Outsider musicians
Pomona College alumni